The 2005 Fordham Rams football team was an American football team that represented Fordham University during the 2005 NCAA Division I-AA football season. Fordham tied for second-to-last in the Patriot League. 

In their second and final year under head coach Ed Foley, the Rams compiled a 2–9 record. James Caffarello, Edward Gordon and Marcus Taylor were the team captains. 

The Rams were outscored 326 to 150. Their 2–4 conference record tied for fifth out of seven in the Patriot League standings. 

Fordham played its home games at Jack Coffey Field on the university's Rose Hill campus in The Bronx, in New York City.

Schedule

References

Fordham
Fordham Rams football seasons
Fordham Rams football